Hemprich's hornbill (Lophoceros hemprichii) is a species of hornbill in the family Bucerotidae. It is found in Djibouti, Eritrea, Ethiopia, Kenya, Somalia, South Sudan, and Uganda.

Habitat
As observed in the Degua Tembien district of north Ethiopia, the bird is found in bushland, scrubland and dense secondary forest, often near cliffs, gorges or water.

References

External links
Oiseaux Pictures

Hemprich's hornbill
Birds of East Africa
Birds of the Horn of Africa
Hemprich's hornbill
Taxonomy articles created by Polbot
Taxa named by Christian Gottfried Ehrenberg